Eucosma magnana is a species of moth of the family Tortricidae. It is found in China (Inner Mongolia), Kyrgyzstan and Vietnam.

The larvae feed on Serratula hirsuta and Serratula tinctoria.

References

Moths described in 1978
Eucosmini